Sadick may refer to:

Given name:
Sadick Abubakar (born 1998), Ghanaian professional footballer
Sadick Hadji Abubakar (born 1992), Ghanaian professional footballer
Sadick Adams (born 1990), Ghanaian professional footballer

Surname:
Lena Sadick, former Hong Kong international lawn and indoor bowler
Maltiti Sayida Sadick, Ghanaian journalist, media personality and news anchor
Mujaid Sadick (born 2000), aka Mujaid, Spanish professional footballer
Sydney Sadick (born 1994), American on-air fashion and entertainment commentator

See also
Ammar Mosque and Osman Ramju Sadick Islamic Centre, mosque and Islamic centre in Wan Chai, Hong Kong